The Joan Gamper Trophy or Joan Gamper Cup is an annual association football exhibition match held in August, before the start of Barcelona's La Liga season, where top division clubs from Europe compete against them. The competition is hosted by FC Barcelona at the Camp Nou stadium and is named in honour of Joan Gamper, a founding member, player, and later president of the club. The competition was inaugurated in 1966 by Enric Llaudet, one of Gamper's successors as club president. The trophy itself is an  silver cup with five micrometres of gold finishing, on top of a  marble plinth base.

Initially, four teams participated in the competition, which featured two semi-finals, a third-place play-off, and a final. For the first competition in 1966, Barcelona were joined by Belgium's Anderlecht, France's Nantes, and Germany's 1. FC Köln. Barcelona beat the German team 3–1 in the final. Köln subsequently won the competition in 1978 and 1981 and were runners-up in 1979, making them the only team, other than the hosts, to win the competition more than once. The next edition saw the first appearance of another Spanish team, Atlético Madrid, who along with the hosts, were joined by German side Bayern Munich, and Argentina's Boca Juniors. The latter two clubs are among the most regular guests. Bayern were runners-up in 1984, 1987 and 2006, while Boca became the first of several South American guests to be invited and have since returned in 1977, 1984, 2003, 2008 and 2018. The only non-European team to win the tournament was Brazil's Internacional, in 1982.

Subsequent competitions have included teams from Italy's Serie A, Germany's Bundesliga, and other leagues. Other top-flight Spanish clubs have also occasionally been invited, including Tenerife and Valencia, who were winners in 1993 and 1994, respectively. Since 1997, the competition has only featured a one-off game, the tournament being shortened due to an increased fixture list and a shorter close season. If the match is tied after ninety minutes, no extra time is played and the winner is decided by a penalty shoot-out.

Winners and results

Four teams (1966–1996) 
{| class="wikitable sortable" style="text-align: ;width:"
|-
!width= |Year
!width=150px| Winners
!width= |Score
!width=150px |Runners-up
!width=150px |Third place
!width= |Score
!width=150px| Fourth place
|-
| 1966 ||  Barcelona ||  ||  1. FC Köln ||  Anderlecht ||  ||  Nantes
|-
| 1967 ||  Barcelona||   ||  Atlético Madrid ||  Boca Juniors ||  ||  Bayern Munich
|-
| 1968 ||  Barcelona ||  ||  Flamengo ||  Athletic Bilbao ||  ||  Werder Bremen 
|-
| 1969 ||  Barcelona||  ||  Zaragoza ||  Slovan Bratislava||  ||  Estudiantes (LP)
|-
| 1970 ||  Újpest ||  ||  Dynamo Moscow ||  Barcelona ||  ||  Schalke 04
|-
| 1971||  Barcelona ||  ||  Chacarita Juniors ||  Budapest Honvéd||  ||  Bayern Munich
|-
| 1972 ||  Borussia MG ||  ||  CSKA Sofia ||  Barcelona ||  ||  Vasco da Gama
|-
| 1973 ||  Barcelona ||  ||  Borussia MG ||  Municipal ||  ||  San Lorenzo
|-
| 1974 || Barcelona||  ||  Rangers ||  Athletic Bilbao ||  ||  Ajax
|-
| 1975 || Barcelona|| ||  Feyenoord ||  Spartak Trnava ||  ||  Újpest 
|-
| 1976 || Barcelona||  ||  Eintracht Frankfurt ||  Sparta Prague ||  ||  CSKA Moscow 
|-
| 1977 || Barcelona||  ||  Schalke 04 ||  Boca Juniors ||  ||  Slovan Bratislava
|-
| 1978 || 1. FC Köln ||  ||  Rapid Wien ||  Barcelona ||  ||  Botafogo
|-
| 1979 ||  Barcelona ||  ||  Köln ||  Anderlecht ||  ||  Zürich 
|-
|1980 ||  Barcelona||  ||  Vasco da Gama ||  River Plate ||  ||  PSV Eindhoven
|-
| 1981 ||  1. FC Köln ||  ||  Barcelona ||  Vasco da Gama ||  ||  Ipswich Town
|-
| 1982 ||  Internacional ||  ||  Manchester City||  Barcelona ||  ||  1. FC Köln
|-
| 1983||  Barcelona ||  ||  Borussia Dortmund ||  Anderlecht ||  ||  Nottingham Forest
|-
| 1984 ||  Barcelona||  ||  Bayern Munich ||  Boca Juniors || ||  Aston Villa
|-
| 1985 || Barcelona || ||  Hamburger SV ||  Ajax ||  ||  Rapid Wien 
|-
| 1986 ||  Barcelona||  ||  PSV Eindhoven ||  Tottenham Hotspur ||  ||  Milan
|-
| 1987 ||  Porto ||  ||  Bayern Munich ||  Barcelona ||  ||  Ajax
|-
| 1988 ||  Barcelona ||  ||  Steaua București ||  Peñarol ||  ||  PSV Eindhoven
|-
| 1989 ||  Mechelen || ||  Sochaux ||  Barcelona ||  ||  Internacional
|-
| 1990 ||  Barcelona ||  ||  Anderlecht || PSV Eindhoven ||  ||  Spartak Moscow
|-
| 1991 || Barcelona||  ||  Marseille ||  Internacional ||  ||  Rapid Wien
|-
| 1992 ||  Barcelona||  ||  Feyenoord ||  CSKA Sofia || ||  Club Brugge
|-
| 1993 ||  Tenerife ||  ||  Barcelona ||  Bordeaux ||  ||  Hajduk Split
|-
| 1994 ||  Valencia || ||  Barcelona ||  PSV Eindhoven ||  ||  Brescia
|-
| 1995 ||  Barcelona ||  ||  San Lorenzo ||  Feyenoord ||  ||  CSKA Sofia
|-
| 1996 ||  Barcelona|| ||  Internazionale ||  Anderlecht ||  ||  San Lorenzo
|}

 Two teams (1997–present) 

Women's Gamper Trophy

Performance by team
Men's

Women's

Awards and records
 Awards 

Most Valuable Player
 Lionel Messi is the only player in the history of Joan Gamper Trophy who has won the man of the match award (MVP) more than once. He has won it four times: in 2013 against Santos, in 2014 against León, in 2016 against Sampdoria, and in 2018 against Boca Juniors.

 Records 
Top goalscorersConsecutive goalscoring Lionel Messi is the only player in the history of Joan Gamper Trophy who has scored in six consecutive editions''' (2013, 2014, 2015, 2016, 2017, 2018).

See also 
 Trofeo Aldo Rovira

References
General

Specific

Footnotes

FC Barcelona
Catalan football friendly trophies
1966 establishments in Spain